Jenji Leslie Kohan (born July 5, 1969) is an American television writer and producer. She is best known as the creator and showrunner of the Showtime comedy-drama series Weeds and the Netflix comedy-drama series Orange Is the New Black. She has received nine Emmy Award nominations, winning one as supervising producer of the comedy series Tracey Takes On....

Early life 
Kohan was born to a Jewish family in Los Angeles, California, the daughter of Rhea Kohan and Alan W. "Buz" Kohan. She is the youngest of three siblings; the other two are twins Jono and David. Much of the family is in show business:
 Father Buz is an Emmy Award-winning television writer and producer, as well as a music composer.
 Mother Rhea is a television writer, novelist, and occasional actress.
 Brother David is an Emmy Award-winning television producer.
Kohan's paternal grandparents were Charles Kohan, who was born in Romania in 1902, and May E. Charles, who was born in New York City, to parents from Russia. The two knew each other from childhood and grew up in a New York City settlement house on the Lower East Side of Manhattan.

Kohan says that her father was the "king of variety television in his day," writing and producing the Oscars and other variety shows. Her mother was a novelist.

Kohan grew up in Beverly Hills, California and graduated from Beverly Hills High School, in 1987. She first attended Brandeis University, then transferred to Columbia University as a sophomore, where she graduated, with a degree in English language and literature, in 1991.

Career 

Kohan's first job in the industry was with The Fresh Prince of Bel-Air, of which Kohan wrote one episode, and later said was a "rough entrance" to the business. After a series of writing jobs on shows such as Mad About You, Tracey Takes On..., and Friends, she collaborated with her brother, David Kohan, writing an outside script for Will & Grace. The siblings also worked together on the sitcom The Stones for CBS, which was ultimately unsuccessful. She has discussed the differences between her and her brother's career saying, "David took the big, commercial, funny route; I was always a little darker personally, and not terrific within the system. I had to make my own way."

Weeds 
Kohan was the creator of the Showtime dark comedy-drama television series Weeds, which she executive produced as showrunner and head writer at her writing studio, Tilted Productions, in Los Angeles, California throughout its entire eight season airing.

Orange Is the New Black 
Kohan created the Netflix comedy drama Orange Is the New Black, an adaptation that was inspired by Piper Kerman's memoir Orange Is the New Black: My Year in a Women's Prison about her experiences in a minimum-security women's prison. Kohan's executive producing duties as showrunner and head writer consists of running the writer's room, which is located at her writing studio, Tilted Productions, in Los Angeles, California. Principal photography takes place in New York.

Netflix, as a streaming service distribution model of TV and movie content, is unique in that it does not provide ratings information, so Kohan does not know exact ratings for Orange Is the New Black, which has been characterized as the most watched original series on Netflix, in a new distribution model where binge viewing is enabled by full seasons of shows being made available at once.

Other projects

Producing 
Kohan has an overall deal with Netflix. She is currently credited as Executive Producer on the Netflix series Teenage Bounty Hunters.

Hayworth Theatre 
Kohan owns the historic Hayworth Theatre in Los Angeles. One floor is used for production and two for postproduction. She plans on turning the auditorium into a venue for performances.

Personal life 
Kohan has three children. The oldest was her son Charlie, who died in a skiing accident on December 31, 2019; the middle child is her daughter Eliza, and the youngest is her son Oscar. They live in the Los Feliz neighborhood of Los Angeles. Kohan and her family are practicing Jews of the Reform denomination.

Filmography
 1994: The Fresh Prince of Bel-Air – writer (1 episode, "Stop Will! in the Name of Love")
 1996: Boston Common – writer (1 episode, "Relationship of Fools")
 1996–1999: Tracey Takes On... – writer (18 episodes); supervising producer/producer (47 episodes)
 1997: Mad About You – producer, writer (1 episode, "The Recital"), written by credit (1 episode, "Astrology")
 1998: Sex and the City – story (1 episode, "The Power of Female Sex")
 2000: Gilmore Girls – producer (12 episodes), writer (1 episode, "Kiss and Tell")
 2002: Will & Grace – writer (1 episode, "Fagel Attraction")
 2002: My Wonderful Life (TV movie) – writer, executive producer
 2004: The Stones – writer, executive producer
 2005–2012: Weeds – creator, writer, executive producer (102 episodes)
 2009: Ronna & Beverly (TV movie) – writer, executive producer
 2010: Tough Trade (TV movie) – creator, writer, executive producer
 2013–2019: Orange Is the New Black – creator, writer, executive producer
 2015: The Devil You Know – creator, writer, executive producer (1 pilot episode)
 2017–2020: GLOW – executive producer
 2019: American Princess – executive producer
 2020: Teenage Bounty Hunters – executive producer

Awards and nominations

References

External links 
 

American television writers
Television producers from California
American women television producers
Primetime Emmy Award winners
Writers Guild of America Award winners
Jewish women writers
American women television writers
Living people
Writers from Los Angeles
Showrunners
Jewish American writers
Columbia College (New York) alumni
American people of Romanian-Jewish descent
American people of Russian-Jewish descent
People from Beverly Hills, California
1969 births
Screenwriters from California
21st-century American Jews
People from Los Feliz, Los Angeles
20th-century American screenwriters
20th-century American women writers
21st-century American screenwriters
21st-century American women writers